Miankuh District is in Ardal County, Chaharmahal and Bakhtiari province, Iran. At the 2006 census, its population was 16,780 in 3,311 households. The following census in 2011 counted 16,327 people in 3,748 households. At the latest census in 2016, the district had 13,697 inhabitants living in 3,631 households.

References 

Ardal County

Districts of Chaharmahal and Bakhtiari Province

Populated places in Chaharmahal and Bakhtiari Province

Populated places in Ardal County